The men's eight competition at the 1960 Summer Olympics took place at took place at Lake Albano, Italy. It was held from 31 August to 3 September. There were 14 boats (126 competitors) from 14 nations, with each nation limited to a single boat in the event. The event was won by the United Team of Germany in that combined team's debut; it was the first medal for any German team since the 1936 Games in Berlin and first-ever gold medal in the event for a German team. Canada repeated as silver medalists. Czechoslovakia won its first men's eight medal with a bronze. The United States, which had won the last eight times the event was held (from 1920 to 1956) and all ten times the nation had appeared before, lost for the first time—finishing fifth, off the podium entirely, despite being heavily favoured once again.

Background

This was the 13th appearance of the event. Rowing had been on the programme in 1896 but was cancelled due to bad weather. The men's eight has been held every time that rowing has been contested, beginning in 1900.

The United States was the dominant nation in the event, with the nation winning the previous eight Olympic men's eight competitions (as well as the other two competitions which the United States had entered). Potential challengers included the United Team of Germany (West Germany had won the 1959 European Rowing Championships), Italy (1957 and 1958 European Rowing Championships winners), and Canada (1958 British Empire and Commonwealth champions and 1959 Pan American Games runners-up). The American team was represented by a crew from the United States Navy. The German side was a combined team from the Ratzeburg and Ditmarsia Kiel clubs; they were competing with a new oar design.

The United Arab Republic made its debut in the event; East and West Germany competed together as the United Team of Germany for the first time. Canada, Great Britain, and the United States each made their 11th appearance, tied for most among nations to that point.

Competition format

The "eight" event featured nine-person boats, with eight rowers and a coxswain. It was a sweep rowing event, with the rowers each having one oar (and thus each rowing on one side). This rowing competition consisted of two main rounds (semifinals and final), as well as a repechage round that allowed teams that did not win their heats to advance to the final. The course used the 2000 metres distance that became the Olympic standard in 1912 (with the exception of 1948).

 Semifinals: Three heats. With 15 boats entered, there were five boats per heat (except in the first heat, where one team did not appear). The winner of each heat advanced directly to the final; all other boats went to the repechage.
 Repechage: Three heats. With 11 boats racing in but not winning their initial heats, there were three or four boats per repechage heat. The top boat in each repechage heat advanced to the final, with the remaining boats eliminated.
 Final: The final consisted of the six boats that had won either the semifinal heats or the repechage heats.

Schedule

All times are Central European Time (UTC+1)

Results

Semifinals

Semifinal 1

Poland was entered in this heat but did not appear.

Semifinal 2

Semifinal 3

Repechage

Repechage heat 1

Repechage heat 2

Repechage heat 3

Final

References

Rowing at the 1960 Summer Olympics